Gavin Kirk (born December 6, 1951) is a British former professional ice hockey player who played 422 games in the World Hockey Association.  He played with the Ottawa Nationals, Toronto Toros, Calgary Cowboys, Birmingham Bulls, and Edmonton Oilers. As a youth, he played in the 1964 Quebec International Pee-Wee Hockey Tournament with a minor ice hockey team from Don Mills.

References

External links

1951 births
Living people
Birmingham Bulls players
Calgary Cowboys players
Canadian ice hockey centres
Edmonton Oilers (WHA) players
Ottawa Nationals players
Sportspeople from London
Toronto Maple Leafs draft picks
Toronto Toros players